Guillermo Roan (born La Plata, 18 June 1988) is an Argentine rugby union player. His usual position is as a Prop and he currently plays for La Plata in Torneo de la URBA.

For 2015-2016 and 2016–17 Pro12 seasons he played for Zebre.

After playing for Argentina Under 20, until 2008, Roan was named in the Argentina XV squad for and 2010 IRB Nations Cup and in 2013 in the Argentina squad for summer international tests.

References

External links 
It's Rugby France Profile
ESPN Profile

1988 births
Living people
Argentine rugby union players
Argentina international rugby union players
Zebre Parma players
Rugby union props
Sportspeople from La Plata
La Plata Rugby Club players
Argentine expatriate sportspeople in Italy
Argentine expatriate sportspeople in England
Argentine expatriate rugby union players
Wasps RFC players
Rugby Rovigo Delta players
Expatriate rugby union players in Italy
Expatriate rugby union players in England
Cavalieri Prato players
London Welsh F.C. players
Pampas XV players